The Beauty and the Beer is the twelfth studio album by German thrash metal band Tankard released on 26 May 2006.

Track listing

Personnel
Andreas "Gerre" Geremia - vocals
Andy Gutjahr - guitar
Frank Thorwarth - bass, backing vocals
Olaf Zissel - drums

References 

2006 albums
Tankard (band) albums
AFM Records albums
Albums produced by Andy Classen